The psoas minor muscle ( or ; from ) is a long, slender skeletal muscle. When present, it is located anterior to the psoas major muscle.

Structure
The psoas minor muscle originates from the vertical fascicles inserted on the last thoracic and first lumbar vertebrae. From there, it passes down onto the medial border of the psoas major, and is inserted to the innominate line and the iliopectineal eminence. Additionally, it attaches to and stretches the deep surface of the iliac fascia and occasionally its lowermost fibers reach the inguinal ligament. It is posteriolateral to the iliopsoas muscle. Variations occur, however, and the insertion on the iliopubic eminence sometimes radiates into the iliopectineal arch.

The psoas minor muscle receives oxygenated blood from the four lumbar arteries (inferior to the subcostal artery) and the lumbar branch of the iliolumbar artery.

Innervation 
The psoas minor muscle is innervated by direct branches of the lumbar spinal nerves.

Variation
The psoas minor muscle is considered inconstant and is often absent, only being present in about 40% of human specimens studied. It has an average length of about 24 cm, of which about 7.1 cm is muscle tissue and about 17 cm is tendon.

Function
The psoas minor is a weak flexor of the lumbar vertebral column.

Other animals 
The psoas minor muscle is present in other mammals, such as horses. In horses, it may be palpated during rectal exams to check for causes of back pain.

Additional images

Notes

References

 
  (ISBN for the Americas 1-58890-159-9.)
 
 

Hip flexors
Hip muscles
Spine flexors
Muscles of the lower limb